Fist of Unicorn (also known as The Unicorn Palm or Bruce Lee and I) is 1973 Hong Kong martial art movie, starring Unicorn Chan. Аction and fight scenes were directed and choreographed by Bruce Lee.

Plot
Once upon a time, the rover whose name is Ah-Lung became friend with the young man called Tiger and Lung was invited by Tiger to join his family. When he arrived to Tiger's family's handyman he enjoyed his new life, however Tiger offended Wong who is short tempered son of a notorious gangster, Lung must protect himself from the gangsters. Later Lung and Tiger forced to join the young women who is pursued by Wong after Wong's gang killed her family at the acrobatic troupe. Ah-Lung shares his martial art knowledge with his new friends he met in order to defeat Wong and his thugs.

Cast
Unicorn Chan as Ah-Lung
Mang Hoi as Bald Kid, Tiger
Meng Chui as Stuttering Wong's dream
Yasuaki Kurata as Sun
Gam Dai
Siu Hung Cham
Wai-man Chan
Chun Chao
Mars as Street Trouper (stuttering boy)
Alan Chui Chung-San as Street Trouper 
Ji Han Jae as Chi Han Kuang 
Hwang In-Shik as Wong's family thug
Wei Ping Ao as Japanese 
Tsui Siu-Ming 
Ching Chen
Hsi Ting Cheng
Alexander Grand as Rensky
Te Tung Ouyang
Cham Siu Hung
Bruce Lee (Unintended cameo), Bruce Lee only made a brief appearance via behind-the-scenes footage, which shows him rehearsing with the actors and stuntmen.
Jackie Chan extra (Uncredited)

Versions
On some DVD covers, Bruce Lee is featured, although he doesn't star in the film.

See also
 Jackie Chan filmography
 List of Hong Kong films
 List of martial arts films

References

Hong Kong martial arts films
1973 films
1970s martial arts films
Kung fu films
Jeet Kune Do films
Chinese martial arts films
1970s Hong Kong films